is a Japanese video game developer founded in 1995, based out of Tokyo. They are best known for developing fighting and beat 'em up games, such as the Tobal No. 1 fighting game series and the high-profile PlayStation 2 launch title The Bouncer, both developed under Square Co. The company's chairman, Seiichi Ishii, is an industry veteran who served as an early designer and director for two fighting game franchises: Virtua Fighter (published by Sega) and Tekken (published by Namco).

Products

Video games

Arcade
Ehrgeiz: God Bless the Ring (1998)
Kenju (2005)

PlayStation
Tobal No. 1 (1996)
Tobal 2 (1997)
Ehrgeiz: God Bless the Ring (1998)

PlayStation 2
The Bouncer (2000)
Crimson Tears (2004)
Yoshitsuneki (2005)
Fighting Beauty Wulong (2006)
Appleseed EX (2007)

Xbox
Ultimate Fighting Championship: Tapout (2002)
Kakuto Chojin: Back Alley Brutal (2003) (as DreamPublishing)
UFC: Tapout 2 (2003)

Wii
Toshinden (2009)

iOS
Xevious ガンプの謎はすべて解けた!? (2016)

Android
Xevious ガンプの謎はすべて解けた!? (2016)

Animation
Zoids: New Century (2001)
Appleseed (2004)

Others
LiveAnimation (2010-)

Notes

References

External links

Software companies based in Tokyo
Video game companies established in 1995
Video game companies of Japan
Video game development companies
Japanese companies established in 1995